21K School World Campus was started in 2020 and is largest  global online school with 21000 members from all over the world with around 8000 students from 74 countries and also includes 500 facilitators. The school is designed to cater to requirements of students from Europe, Asia Pacific, Middle East and Africa. The school is planned to cover 1.5 Billion School going students from 205 countries covering all time zones.

History and Objective 

21K School World Campus was started with the objective of providing the students a channel of learning,being innovational,building and developing themselves from their homes.

Syllabus 

21K School World Campus is striving to enhance the educational quality and follows Cambridge Assessment International Education (CAIE) and Pearson Edexcel qualifications.

Facility 

21K School World Campus has the facilities in 1. Good curriculum and dynamic learning tools 2. Curriculum with varied choices 3.Efficient and professional facilitators 4. Customised learning environment for children.

See also 

 Virtual Education

References

External links 
 Official Website
 Official Website

Online schools